Hoseynabad-e Sar Kal (also Romanized as Ḩoseynābād-e Sar Kal and Ḩoseynābād Sar Kal; also known as Ḩoseynābād Abaleh) is a village in Bandan Rural District, in the Central District of Nehbandan County, South Khorasan Province, Iran. At the 2006 census, its population was 39, in 7 families.

References 

Populated places in Nehbandan County